The 2013 Spa-Francorchamps GP2 Series round was a GP2 Series motor race held on August 24 and 25, 2013 at Circuit de Spa-Francorchamps, Belgium. It was the eighth round of the 2013 GP2 Series. The race supported the 2013 Belgian Grand Prix.

Classification

Qualifying

Feature race

Sprint race

See also 
 2013 Belgian Grand Prix
 2013 Spa-Francorchamps GP3 Series round

References 

Spa-Francorchamps
GP2